Nazi analogies or Nazi comparisons are any comparisons or parallels which are related to Nazism or Nazi Germany, which often reference Adolf Hitler, Joseph Goebbels, the SS, or the Holocaust. Despite criticism, such comparisons have been employed for a wide variety of reasons since Hitler's rise to power. Some Nazi comparisons are logical fallacies, such as reductio ad Hitlerum. Godwin's law asserts that a Nazi analogy is increasingly likely the longer an internet discussion continues; Mike Godwin also stated that not all Nazi comparisons are invalid.

Origins

During the Nazi era, Adolf Hitler was frequently compared to previous leaders including Napoleon, Philip of Macedon, and Nebuchadnezzar. The comparers wanted to make Hitler understandable to their audiences by comparing him to known leaders, but according to historian Gavriel Rosenfeld the comparisons obscured Hitler's radical evil. When Hitler became Chancellor of Germany on 30 January 1933, Hitler was compared to Napoleon by The Brooklyn Eagle and Middletown Times. The Night of Long Knives was compared at the time to such events as the St. Bartholomew’s Day Massacre, a 1572 massacre of French Huguenots by Catholics. The comparison between Hitler and Philip of Macedon was used by some American journalists who advocated the United States's entry into World War II. Others felt that this did not go far enough and used other metaphors such as Nebuchadnezzar and Tamerlane: Harold Denny of The New York Times visited Buchenwald and later stated that "Tamerlane built his mountain of skulls ... Hitler’s horrors … dwarf all previous crimes". In a public radio broadcast of 24 August 1941, Winston Churchill compared Nazi war crimes in the Soviet Union to the Mongol invasion of Europe, saying "There has never [since] been methodical, merciless butchery on such a scale, or approaching such a scale."

Nazism has come to be a metaphor for evil, according to academic Brian Johnson, leading to Nazi comparisons. The Anti-Defamation League suggested that the Nazi era had become the "most available historical event illustrating right versus wrong." Rosenfeld noted that Hitler "gained immortality as a historical analogy" and that he became:

Legal issues
According to the ACLU, calling someone a Nazi is protected free speech under the First Amendment to the United States Constitution. In 2008, British radio presenter Jon Gaunt called a guest a Nazi, for which he was fired. An Ofcom complaint against TalkSport, his employer, was upheld by the United Kingdom High Court of Justice in 2010. In 2019, the Ukrainian S14 group won a defamation suit against Hromadske, a newspaper which had labeled them neo-Nazi, despite such a characterization having been used by Reuters and The Washington Post. In Israel, a law was proposed in 2014 that would make it illegal to call someone a Nazi or use symbols associated with the Holocaust (such as striped clothing or yellow stars), in order to respect Holocaust survivors.

Fallacies
Reductio ad Hitlerum, first coined in 1951 by Leo Strauss, is a logical fallacy which discounts an idea because it was promoted by Hitler or Nazis. Godwin's law, coined in 1990 by Mike Godwin, asserts that "as an online discussion grows longer, the probability of a comparison involving Nazis or Hitler approaches 1".  A related convention is "Whoever mentions Hitler first, loses the argument." However, Godwin has said that not all Nazi comparisons are invalid.

List

Animals

Anti-smoking

Public health measures adopted since World War II in order to reduce smoking have been compared with anti-tobacco movement in Nazi Germany, which is considered by proponents of anti-smoking measures to be a fallacious reductio  ad  Hitlerum which often exaggerates how much the Nazis actually opposed smoking. Historian of science Robert N. Proctor speculates that Nazi associations "forestall[ed] the development of effective anti-tobacco measures by several decades".

Bioethics
According to an editorial by Arthur Caplan in Science, bioethics questions including "stem cell research, end-of-life care, the conduct of clinical trials in poor nations, abortion, embryo research, animal experimentation, genetic testing, or human experimentation involving vulnerable populations" are often compared to Nazi eugenics and Nazi human experimentation. According to Caplan, the Nazi analogy has the potential to shut down debate and its capricious use is unethical. Similar arguments were made by Nat Hentoff in 1988, writing for The Hastings Center Report.

Chinese Communist Party
Analogies between China and Nazi Germany have also been drawn by Australian politician Andrew Hastie. However, China–Nazi comparisons are considered by Edward Luce to be a form of anti-Chinese sentiment and potentially a self-fulfilling prophecy. In July 2020, British Jewish leader Marie van der Zyl said that there were "similarities" between the treatment of the Uyghurs in China and the crimes committed by Nazi Germany.

Chinazi flag

Donald Trump

While qualified comparisons between Hitler's rise to power and the victory of Donald Trump in the 2016 United States presidential election have been made by some historians,  NeverTrump Republicans, and Democrats, the comparison is opposed by other scholars and commentators who cite reasons such as Trump lacking a coherent ideology, not supporting a dictatorship or political violence, and his rejection of interventionist foreign policy. According to Rosenfeld's research, the frequency of comparisons between Trump and Hitler in the media peaked in 2017 and the number of internet searches for "Trump and Hitler" has also decreased from a high point between mid-2015 and mid-2017.

European Union

Some Eurosceptic politicians, including UKIP's Gerard Batten and Finns Party MP Ville Tavio, have compared the European Union to Nazi Germany. Ukrainian politician Viktor Medvedchuk of the pro-Russia party Ukrainian Choice argues that "objectively" the European Union is the heir of Nazi Germany. In many Greek newspapers during the Greek government-debt crisis, caricatures appeared depicting the European troika and Angela Merkel as Nazis preparing to reenact the Axis occupation of Greece. Merkel was also depicted as Hitler during demonstrations against her 2016 visit to the Czech Republic; the demonstrators objected to her approach to the European migrant crisis. Opponents argue that the Nazi empire was formed by conquest and that joining the EU is voluntary, among other differences.

Indian Wars
The Nazi war of annihilation on the Eastern Front has been compared to the United States Army's conduct in the Indian Wars. However, Native American demographic collapse was mostly caused by introduced disease, rather than warfare, and historians disagree as to whether the Indian Wars, or parts thereof, can be considered a form of genocide.

Islamism and Islamic fundamentalism

Some historians, including Matthias Küntzel, Wolfgang G. Schwanitz and Barry Rubin, argue that there is a high degree of similarity between the ideologies of Nazism and Islamism, especially in their radical antisemitism and xenophobia.

Israel

Whether comparisons between Israel and Nazi Germany are intrinsically antisemitic is disputed. The Anti-Defamation League considers the comparison to be inaccurate and antisemitic, and is part of the Working Definition of Antisemitism. However, there have been Holocaust survivors who have made the comparison themselves, mirroring their experiences to those of Palestinians.

LGBT issues
The AIDS–Holocaust metaphor can be controversial. While Susan Sontag said that "It's wrong to compare a situation in which there was real culpability to one in which there is none", it is also the case that homophobic views resulted in dismissal of the suggestion of research and treatment being supported, severely exacerbating the epidemic.

In 2017, Patriarch Kirill, the highest authority in the Russian Orthodox Church, compared same-sex marriage to Nazism because in his opinion both were a threat to traditional family. In 2019, Pope Francis criticized politicians who lash out at homosexuals, Romani people, and Jews, saying that it reminded him of Adolf Hitler's speeches in the 1930s.

Some advocates of trans-exclusionary radical feminism have compared transgender medical care to Nazi human experimentation or transsexuality to Nazism.

"Second Holocaust"

The term "second Holocaust" is used for perceived threats to the State of Israel, Jews, and Jewish life. In 2018, Israeli Prime Minister Benjamin Netanyahu said "Iran wants a second Holocaust" and to "destroy another six million plus Jews", after his Iranian counterpart described Israel as a "malignant cancerous tumor". In 2019, Israeli education minister Rafi Peretz compared Jewish intermarriage to a "second Holocaust".

Stalinism

Wealth
In 2014, venture capitalist and billionaire Thomas Perkins wrote to The Wall Street Journal to compare what he called "the progressive war on the American one percent" to what Jews faced during Kristallnacht. According to Jordan Weissmann, writing in The Atlantic, this is "the worst historical analogy you will read for a long, long time". Perkins was also criticized on Twitter, with The New York Times journalist Steven Greenhouse writing, "As someone who lost numerous relatives to the Nazi gas chambers, I find statements like this revolting & inexplicable". Perkins later apologized for the comparison.

Criticism

According to a press release of the United States Holocaust Memorial Museum, "Careless Holocaust analogies may demonize, demean, and intimidate their targets." Jonathan Greenblatt, director of the Anti-Defamation League, said that "misplaced comparisons trivialise this unique tragedy in human history... particularly when public figures invoke the Holocaust in an effort to score political points."

In 2017, the German journalist  argued that Nazi comparisons were undergoing a process akin to inflation due to their increased and inappropriate use.

Amanda Moorghen, a researcher for the English Speaking Union, said that Nazi comparisons were not often persuasive: "Wielding accusations of fascism as an insult doesn't help to get your audience on side - instead, you raise the stakes of the debate, forcing a polarisation between 'good' and 'evil' into a discussion that may have reasonable positions on both sides." Instead, she recommended criticizing the opponent's argument directly.

See also
Holocaust trivialization
Holocaust uniqueness debate
Never again
Fascist (insult)
Misuse of term "Denazification"

References

Source

Further reading

External links

 
Comparisons
Analogy